Mehmed Said Halim Pasha (18 or 28 January 1865 or 19 February 1864 – 6 December 1921) was an Ottoman statesman of Albanian origin who served as Grand Vizier of the Ottoman Empire from 1913 to 1917. He was one of the perpetrators of the Armenian genocide and later assassinated by Arshavir Shirakian as part of Operation Nemesis, a retribution campaign to kill perpetrators of the Armenian genocide.

Biography
Born at the palace of Shubra in Cairo, Egypt, he was the grandson of Muhammad Ali of Egypt, often considered the founder of modern Egypt.
He was educated by private teachers and later in Switzerland.
In 1890 or 1895, he married Emine İnci Tosun, daughter of Mehmed Tosun Pasha.
In the late 1890s the Palace of Said Halim Pasha in Downtown Cairo was built for him by the Italian architect Antonio Lasciac.

When Britain annexed Egypt in 1914, he claimed the throne of the Egyptian monarchy based on a firman which changed Egyptian succession law half a century ago.

He succeeded Mahmud Shevket Pasha following his assassination, and was both Grand Vizier and Foreign Minister. He was a compromise candidate for the Committee of Union and Progress (CUP); Said Halim was loosely affiliated with the committee, and more conservative and Islamist than the central committee would have wanted, however the prestige of his ancestry and his lack of agency made him an acceptable Grand Vizier to the CUP.

He was one of the signers in Ottoman–German Alliance. Yet, he resigned after the incident of the pursuit of the Goeben and the Breslau, an event which served to bring the Ottoman Empire into the Great War. It is claimed that Mehmed V wanted a person in whom he trusted as Grand Vizier, and that he asked Said Halim to stay in his post as long as possible. 

During the Armenian genocide, Said Halim signed the deportation orders for the Armenian population. The Armenian Patriarch Zaven I Der Yeghiayan appealed to him to cease the terror being committed against Armenians, which Said Halim replied to by claiming reports of arrests and deportations were being greatly exaggerated. Der Yeghiayan himself was later deported.

He lost his Foreign Ministry in 1915. Said Halim's premiership lasted until 1917, cut short because of continuous clashes between him and the CUP. The Interior Minister Mehmed Talaat Pasha succeeded him.

Said Halim was accused of treason during the court martial trials after World War I in the Ottoman Empire, as he had his signature under Ottoman–German Alliance. He was exiled on 29 May 1919 to a prison on Malta. He was acquitted from the accusations and set free in 1921, and he moved to Sicily. He wanted to return to Istanbul, the capital of the Ottoman Empire, but this request was rejected. He was assassinated soon after in Rome by Arshavir Shirakian, an agent of the Armenian Revolutionary Federation, for his role in the Armenian genocide.

See also 
 Said Halim government
 Operation Nemesis
 List of Ottoman Grand Viziers
 Muhammad Ali dynasty

Footnotes

Literature

External links

 

1865 births
1921 deaths
Armenian genocide perpetrators
Exiles from the Ottoman Empire
Malta exiles
People from the Ottoman Empire murdered abroad
Muhammad Ali dynasty
People murdered in Italy
Deaths by firearm in Italy
Assassinated people from the Ottoman Empire
20th-century Grand Viziers of the Ottoman Empire
People acquitted of treason
Albanian Grand Viziers of the Ottoman Empire
Ottoman people of the Balkan Wars
Ottoman people of World War I
Ministers of Foreign Affairs of the Ottoman Empire
Recipients of the Order of the Star of Romania
Members of the Senate of the Ottoman Empire
People assassinated by Operation Nemesis
1921 murders in Italy